Dungeon Hunter: Alliance is a hack and slash action role-playing video game developed and published by Gameloft in 2011. The game is a remake of the 2009 iPhone game Dungeon Hunter, with the addition of a multiplayer mode and support for the PlayStation Move controller.

Gameplay
The game is set in a fantasy universe. Three character classes – mage, rogue, and warrior – are playable, with the game taking place over 30 levels in environments including dungeons, forests, and villages, which include randomly generated areas. Single quests are estimated to last 8 hours. Players can restart their game after completing all quests on an Elite mode, which enables them to level up to level 75.

Multiplayer mode supports up to 4 players on a single server. Each player works together to complete the current quest of the host player, although players who are not on that quest in singleplayer mode will not have their data saved except for items and experience. Each player is assigned a color and their character can only pick up items with that color around them, ensuring each player gets an equal amount of loot. Unlike in singleplayer, when a character dies, the other players have a chance to revive him or her instead of having to completely restart the level. When all players die, the level will be restarted however.

Reception

The PlayStation 3 version of Dungeon Hunter: Alliance received "average" reviews, while the Vita version received "generally unfavorable reviews", according to the review aggregation website Metacritic. The PlayStation Move implementation was criticised as not working well, the gameplay was considered well implemented, but generic and dated. As released the PS3 version had technical issues with the multiplayer online game hosting, but was eventually fixed.

In Japan, where the game was ported under the name  and released for the PS3 version on September 13, 2011, and for the Vita version on December 17, 2011, Famitsu gave the latter a score of all four eights for a total of 32 out of 40.

References

External links

2011 video games
Action role-playing video games
Gameloft games
MacOS games
Multiplayer and single-player video games
PlayStation 3 games
PlayStation Move-compatible games
PlayStation Network games
PlayStation Vita games
Video games developed in Canada